The arrondissement of Bernay is an arrondissement of France in the Eure department in the Normandy region. It has 297 communes.

Composition

The communes of the arrondissement of Bernay are:

Aclou
Aizier
Ambenay
Amfreville-Saint-Amand
Appeville-Annebault
Armentières-sur-Avre
Asnières
Authou
Bacquepuis
Bailleul-la-Vallée
Bâlines
Barc
Les Barils
Barneville-sur-Seine
Barquet
Barville
Les Baux-de-Breteuil
Bazoques
Beaumontel
Beaumont-le-Roger
Le Bec-Hellouin
Le Bec-Thomas
Bémécourt
Bérengeville-la-Campagne
Bernay
Bernienville
Berthouville
Berville-la-Campagne
Berville-sur-Mer
Beuzeville
Bois-Anzeray
Bois-Arnault
Le Bois-Hellain
Boisney
Bois-Normand-près-Lyre
Boissey-le-Châtel
Boissy-Lamberville
Bonneville-Aptot
Le Bosc-du-Theil
Bosgouet
Bosrobert
Bosroumois
Les Bottereaux
Boulleville
Bouquelon
Bouquetot
Bourg-Achard
Bournainville-Faverolles
Bourneville-Sainte-Croix
Bourth
Bray
Brestot
Breteuil
Brétigny
Breux-sur-Avre
Brionne
Broglie
Brosville
Calleville
Campigny
Canappeville
Caorches-Saint-Nicolas
Capelle-les-Grands
Caumont
Cauverville-en-Roumois
Cesseville
Chaise-Dieu-du-Theil
Chamblac
Chambois
Chambord
La Chapelle-Bayvel
La Chapelle-Gauthier
La Chapelle-Hareng
Chennebrun
Chéronvilliers
Colletot
Combon
Condé-sur-Risle
Conteville
Cormeilles
Corneville-la-Fouquetière
Corneville-sur-Risle
Courbépine
Courteilles
Crestot
Criquebeuf-la-Campagne
Crosville-la-Vieille
Daubeuf-la-Campagne
Drucourt
Duranville
Écaquelon
Écardenville-la-Campagne
Écauville
Ecquetot
Émanville
Épaignes
Épégard
Épreville-en-Lieuvin
Épreville-près-le-Neubourg
Étréville
Éturqueraye
Fatouville-Grestain
Le Favril
Ferrières-Saint-Hilaire
Feuguerolles
Fiquefleur-Équainville
Flancourt-Crescy-en-Roumois
Folleville
Fontaine-l'Abbé
Fontaine-la-Louvet
Fort-Moville
Foulbec
Fouqueville
Franqueville
Freneuse-sur-Risle
Fresne-Cauverville
Giverville
Glos-sur-Risle
La Goulafrière
Goupil-Othon
Gournay-le-Guérin
Grand-Bourgtheroulde
Grand-Camp
Graveron-Sémerville
Grosley-sur-Risle
Harcourt
La Harengère
Hauville
La Haye-Aubrée
La Haye-de-Calleville
La Haye-de-Routot
La Haye-du-Theil
La Haye-Saint-Sylvestre
Hecmanville
Hectomare
Heudreville-en-Lieuvin
Hondouville
Honguemare-Guenouville
L'Hosmes
La Houssaye
Houetteville
Illeville-sur-Montfort
Iville
Juignettes
La Lande-Saint-Léger
Le Landin
Launay
Le Lesme
Lieurey
Livet-sur-Authou
Malleville-sur-le-Bec
Malouy
Mandeville
Mandres
Manneville-la-Raoult
Manneville-sur-Risle
Marais-Vernier
Marbeuf
Marbois
Martainville
Mélicourt
Menneval
Mesnil-en-Ouche
Mesnil-Rousset
Le Mesnil-Saint-Jean
Mesnils-sur-Iton
Montfort-sur-Risle
Montreuil-l'Argillé
Les Monts du Roumois
Morainville-Jouveaux
Morsan
Nassandres sur Risle
Neaufles-Auvergny
Le Neubourg
La Neuve-Lyre
La Neuville-du-Bosc
Neuville-sur-Authou
Noards
La Noë-Poulain
Notre-Dame-d'Épine
Notre-Dame-du-Hamel
Le Noyer-en-Ouche
Le Perrey
Piencourt
Piseux
Les Places
Plainville
Le Planquay
Plasnes
Le Plessis-Sainte-Opportune
Pont-Audemer
Pont-Authou
La Poterie-Mathieu
Les Préaux
Pullay
La Pyle
Quillebeuf-sur-Seine
Quittebeuf
Romilly-la-Puthenaye
Rougemontiers
Rouge-Perriers
Routot
Rugles
Saint-Agnan-de-Cernières
Saint-Antonin-de-Sommaire
Saint-Aubin-d'Écrosville
Saint-Aubin-de-Scellon
Saint-Aubin-du-Thenney
Saint-Aubin-sur-Quillebeuf
Saint-Benoît-des-Ombres
Saint-Christophe-sur-Avre
Saint-Christophe-sur-Condé
Saint-Cyr-de-Salerne
Saint-Cyr-la-Campagne
Saint-Denis-d'Augerons
Saint-Denis-des-Monts
Saint-Didier-des-Bois
Sainte-Colombe-la-Commanderie
Saint-Éloi-de-Fourques
Sainte-Marie-d'Attez
Sainte-Opportune-du-Bosc
Sainte-Opportune-la-Mare
Saint-Étienne-l'Allier
Saint-Georges-du-Vièvre
Saint-Germain-de-Pasquier
Saint-Germain-la-Campagne
Saint-Grégoire-du-Vièvre
Saint-Jean-du-Thenney
Saint-Laurent-du-Tencement
Saint-Léger-de-Rôtes
Saint-Léger-du-Gennetey
Saint-Maclou
Saint-Mards-de-Blacarville
Saint-Mards-de-Fresne
Saint-Martin-du-Tilleul
Saint-Martin-Saint-Firmin
Saint-Meslin-du-Bosc
Saint-Ouen-de-Pontcheuil
Saint-Ouen-de-Thouberville
Saint-Ouen-du-Tilleul
Saint-Paul-de-Fourques
Saint-Philbert-sur-Boissey
Saint-Philbert-sur-Risle
Saint-Pierre-de-Cernières
Saint-Pierre-de-Cormeilles
Saint-Pierre-de-Salerne
Saint-Pierre-des-Fleurs
Saint-Pierre-des-Ifs
Saint-Pierre-du-Bosguérard
Saint-Pierre-du-Val
Saint-Samson-de-la-Roque
Saint-Siméon
Saint-Sulpice-de-Grimbouville
Saint-Sylvestre-de-Cormeilles
Saint-Symphorien
Saint-Victor-de-Chrétienville
Saint-Victor-d'Épine
Saint-Victor-sur-Avre
Saint-Vincent-du-Boulay
La Saussaye
Selles
Serquigny
Sylvains-les-Moulins
Le Theil-Nolent
Thénouville
Thiberville
Thibouville
Thierville
Le Thuit-de-l'Oison
Le Tilleul-Lambert
Tillières-sur-Avre
Tocqueville
Le Torpt
Tournedos-Bois-Hubert
Tourville-la-Campagne
Tourville-sur-Pont-Audemer
Toutainville
Treis-Sants-en-Ouche
Le Tremblay-Omonville
La Trinité-de-Réville
La Trinité-de-Thouberville
Triqueville
Le Troncq
Trouville-la-Haule
Valailles
Valletot
Vannecrocq
Venon
Verneuil d'Avre et d'Iton
Verneusses
La Vieille-Lyre
Vieux-Port
Villettes
Villez-sur-le-Neubourg
Vitot
Voiscreville
Vraiville

History

The arrondissement of Bernay was created in 1800. It was expanded in 2006 with the canton of Amfreville-la-Campagne from the arrondissement of Évreux. At the January 2017 reorganisation of the arrondissements of Eure, it gained 77 communes from the arrondissement of Évreux and one commune from the arrondissement of Les Andelys, and it lost one commune to the arrondissement of Évreux.

As a result of the reorganisation of the cantons of France which came into effect in 2015, the borders of the cantons are no longer related to the borders of the arrondissements. The cantons of the arrondissement of Bernay were, as of January 2015:

 Amfreville-la-Campagne
 Beaumesnil
 Beaumont-le-Roger
 Bernay-Est
 Bernay-Ouest
 Beuzeville
 Bourgtheroulde-Infreville
 Brionne
 Broglie
 Cormeilles
 Montfort-sur-Risle
 Pont-Audemer
 Quillebeuf-sur-Seine
 Routot
 Saint-Georges-du-Vièvre
 Thiberville

References

Bernay